Polyarthra may refer to two different groups of organisms:
 Polyarthra Lang, 1944, an order of crustaceans
 Polyarthra Ehrenberg, 1834, a genus of rotifers